China and the Christian Impact was published in 1985 as the English translation of Jacques Gernet's Chine et christianisme of 1982. It received considerable attention from academic circles dealing with China and the Jesuit mission, mainly because of its approach to the subject from an almost exclusively Chinese point of view. In this Gernet differs much from previous studies on the China mission, the most famous up to that point perhaps being the Jesuit George Dunne's Generation of Giants (1962), which analyzes the Jesuit China mission from a decidedly eurocentric perspective. In spite of the wide range of source material consulted by its author, Gernet's book has been criticized on account of its apparent anachronisms, and lack of explanatory background information when dealing with historically related events.

See also
 Jesuit China missions

Sources 

 Gernet, Jacques, Chine et christianisme. Action et réaction, Paris: Gallimard, 1982. (reedited in 1991 as Chine et christianisme. La première confrontation)
 Gernet, Jacques and Lloyd, Janet (transl.), China and the Christian Impact. A Conflict of Cultures, Cambridge: Cambridge University Press, 1985

Reviews 

 Ching, Julia in: History of religions 27(1), August 1987
 Barrett, T.H. in: Journal of Ecclesiastical History 38 (1), January 1987
 Cohen, Paul A. in: Harvard Journal of Asiatic Studies 47 (2), 1987
 Pratt, Keith in: Bulletin of the School of Oriental and African Studies 51 (1), 1988
 Mungello, David E. in: Catholic Historical Review 74 (1), January 1988
 Spence, Jonathan D. in: China Quarterly 108, 1986
 Simon Leys : The Burning Forest, August 1988

Jesuit China missions